Espírito Santo do Turvo is a municipality in the Brazilian state of São Paulo.

History

The donation of a tract of land for the construction of a church is the landmark in the history of this city.  On 23 March 1878, after significant growth Espírito Santo do Turvo received the title of Freguesia, a secondary local administrative unit in Portugal, by Law No. 08, and was marked as a Religious Heritage Site.  Seven years later, in March 1885, the Law No. 20 raised it to the level of Town.

Government

 Mayor: João Adirson Pacheco (2009–2012)

Geography

Rivers
 Turvo River
 Pardo River

Demography

Its population in 2020 was 4,878 inhabitants.

2000 Census figures
Total population: 3,677
 Urban: 3,241
 Rural: 436
 Men: 1,900
 Women: 1,777
Density (inhabitants/km2): 19.22 
Infant mortality up to 1 year old (per thousand): 16.70 
Life expectancy (years): 70.78 
Fertility rate (children per woman): 2.63 
Literacy rate: 87.69% 
Human Development Index (HDI): 0.755
 Income: 0.666
 Longevity: 0.763
 Education: 0,835

Economy

Its economy is based on agriculture with large production of peanuts and cotton.  Espírito Santo do Turvo is an important junction to the south, Mato Grosso, and other regions.

Transport

 SP-225 state highway
 SP-280 tollway
 BR-369 highway

Education

Culture

Sports

Twin cities

References

External links

 (in Portuguese)
Associação Paulista de Municípios [Paulista Association of Municipalities] (in Portuguese)
Censo 2010 at IBGE
Hino do município de Espírito Santo do Turvo [Anthem of Espírito Santo do Turvo Municipality] (in Portuguese) at Wikisource

Municipalities in São Paulo (state)
1878 establishments in Brazil